The Glenn H. Curtiss Mansion and Gardens is a historic home located at 500 Deer Run in Miami Springs, Florida and open to the public as an event space or for private tours by prior arrangement.

It is located at the northern edge of Miami International Airport.

History
Designed in the Pueblo Revival style, the mansion was constructed in 1925 by aviation pioneer Glenn Hammond Curtiss, developer of the Cities of Hialeah and Opa-locka, Florida, as well as Miami Springs. Curtiss lived at the large, two-story residence with his wife, Lena Curtiss, until his death in 1930. Mrs. Curtiss referred to the mansion as "Dar-Err-Aha," which means "House of Happiness."

The mansion was the largest of Pueblo themed houses built by the Curtiss-Wright Company in its development of Country Club Estates in Miami Springs. The house features a central patio that faces the eastern perimeter of the golf course. Curtiss brought many species of water birds to the lake, including flamingos and swans. Together with the adjacent property, it formed a  complex.

After Curtiss's death in the early 1930s, Lena Curtiss married an old friend and business associate of her husband, H. Sayre Wheeler. Wheeler served as mayor of Miami Springs from 1942 to 1944, and was also part owner of the Michaels and Wheeler Insurance Company. The couple lived in the house until the late 1940s. The estate was sold in the mid-1950s and became the world-renowned Miami Springs Villas. It was sold to Forte Hotels, International, Inc. in the late 1970s and is currently owned by the city of Miami Springs.

Since 1998, the Pueblo Revival-style Mansion has been the property of the City of Miami Springs, and the not-for-profit all volunteer Curtiss Mansion, Inc. was formed to restore and operate this historic home.

Designated a Miami Springs historic site in 1987, the mansion was added to the NRHP on December 21, 2001.

Architecture
Its architect, Martin L. Hampton, was one of Miami's most prominent architects during the 1920s—his designs include the former Miami Beach City Hall and the Congress Building in downtown Miami. The house is roughly V-shaped in plan and constructed of hollow clay tile with a rough textured stucco exterior. The roof is flat with very irregular parapet walls embellished by projecting waterspouts and irregular shaped openings. The main entrance to the residence is set within a deeply recessed T-shaped opening and marked by a flat-roofed porte cochere. At the south end of the lake is an arbor and barbecue grill. The grill was constructed of oolitic limestone (coral rock), which was a by-product of digging the lake.

Restoration

Beginning in the late 1970s, the house was subject to vandalism and a number of fires. In 1998, a public/private partnership of Curtiss Mansion, Inc. (CMI), along with the State of Florida Division of Historical Resources, Miami-Dade County, Miami-Dade County Commissioner Rebeca Sosa, the Miami-Dade County Metropolitan Planning Organization, the Florida Municipal Insurance Trust, the Miami Springs Historical Society, the City of Miami Springs and countless private and corporate donors, the Mansion doors reopened to the public in 2012. After 17 years of grassroots efforts, including raising several million dollars, the Mansion became available for historic, cultural, educational, recreational, social, civic and other community uses.  Although the mansion is owned by the City of Miami Springs, CMI is tasked with sustaining fundraising efforts, maintenance, daily operations and oversight of the Mansion and all of its activities.

See also
Miami Springs, Florida
Opa-locka Airport
 Wright brothers
 Curtiss-Wright Corporation (aviation company founded by Glenn Curtiss but otherwise unrelated to the history of Miami Springs).

Sources
 http://www.cr.nps.gov/nr/travel/aviation/gle.htm Accessed in 2006

References

External links

Curtiss Mansion Official Website
NPS Glenn Curtiss Mansion
 MiamiSprings.com
 Dade County listings at National Register of Historic Places
Aviation: From Sand Dunes to Sonic Booms, a National Park Service Discover Our Shared Heritage Travel Itinerary
 Florida's Office of Cultural and Historical Programs
 Dade County listings
 Glenn H. Curtiss House
 Great Floridians of Miami Springs

Houses on the National Register of Historic Places in Florida
Houses in Miami-Dade County, Florida
National Register of Historic Places in Miami-Dade County, Florida
Pueblo Revival architecture in Miami Springs, Florida
Houses completed in 1925